Emma Claesson (née Engstrand; born 14 December 1977) is a Swedish orienteering competitor from Borlänge. She received a silver medal on the relay at the 2007 World Orienteering Championships in Kyiv, and a bronze medal in 2005. As a last-minute replacement in the Swedish relay team, she earned a bronze medal in the relay at the 2010 World Orienteering Championships in Trondheim, Norway. This was her second medal at those Championships, as she earned another bronze in the long distance, her first individual WOC medal. She is an 11-time Swedish champion.

References

External links
 
 
  

1977 births
Living people
People from Bollnäs
Swedish orienteers
Female orienteers
Foot orienteers
World Orienteering Championships medalists
Sportspeople from Gävleborg County
20th-century Swedish women
21st-century Swedish women
Junior World Orienteering Championships medalists